James Madden may refer to:

J. Lester Madden (1909–1984), American figure skater
James Loomis Madden (1892–1972), acting chancellor of New York University, 1951–1952
Jim Madden (born 1958), Australian politician
James Madden (footballer) (born 1999), Irish Australian rules footballer for the Brisbane Lions
James Madden (hurler) (born 1996), player for Dublin